Lancun Township is a township under the administration of Mayang Miao Autonomous County, Hunan, China. , it administers the following 10 villages:
Lancun Village 
Yanshancha Village
Tonggulong Village
Longtian Village
Jiaolin Village
Da'ao Village
Wangyuan Village
Yan'ao Village
Longpan Village
Nixilong Village

See also 
 List of township-level divisions of Hunan

References 

Townships of Huaihua
Mayang Miao Autonomous County